The 2018 WAFF U-16 Championship is the sixth edition of the WAFF Youth Competition. The previous edition was an Under-16 age group competition held in Jordan in 2015.

Participating nations

Results

Champion

References

External links 
 

U16 2018
WAFF U-16 Championship
International association football competitions hosted by Jordan
2018 in Asian football
2018–19 in Jordanian football